Bally Sports SoCal is an American regional sports network owned by Diamond Sports Group, a joint venture between Sinclair Broadcast Group and Entertainment Studios, and operated as part of Bally Sports, along with its sister network Bally Sports West. The channel broadcasts regional coverage of professional and collegiate sports events in California, focusing primarily on teams based in the Greater Los Angeles area. Bally Sports SoCal is available on cable providers throughout Southern California, the Las Vegas Valley and Hawaii; it is also available nationwide on satellite via DirecTV.

The network holds the regional broadcast rights to the Los Angeles Clippers of the National Basketball Association and the Anaheim Ducks of the National Hockey League. The network also broadcast the Los Angeles Dodgers of Major League Baseball until 2014, when broadcasts moved to Spectrum SportsNet LA.

History

Beginnings

The original Prime Ticket (currently Bally Sports West) was launched on October 19, 1985, and became one of the leading regional sports networks in the United States. Rival network SportsChannel Los Angeles ceased operations on December 31, 1992, which would eventually create a need for a new regional sports network. After SportsChannel's closure, Prime Ticket acquired the broadcast rights to the Los Angeles Angels and Los Angeles Clippers which had previously broadcast on SportsChannel. However, the Los Angeles Dodgers opted to not to make a deal with Prime Ticket, instead staying off cable for the next four seasons. The network would retain the Prime Ticket name until it was rebranded in 1994 as Prime Sports West and later then Fox Sports West in 1996 when it joined Fox Sports Net.

Fox Sports West 2
On January 27, 1997, Fox Sports Net launched an additional channel, Fox Sports West 2, to provide the broadcast of 40 Los Angeles Dodgers games. The Dodgers had not had any local cable broadcasts of their games since the 1992 season. Additionally, Los Angeles Clippers and Anaheim Ducks games were moved from Fox Sports West, as well as UCLA and USC basketball games that were not part of Fox's existing Pac-10 package. Other new programming included coverage of other college sports at UCLA and USC, high school basketball and football, and horse racing from Santa Anita and Hollywood Park Initially Fox Sports West 2 did not have widespread cable coverage, leading to many complaints and a failed lawsuit by the Ducks seeking to return their games back on Fox Sports West. Four months after it launched the new network had secured deals to reach 1.1 million subscribers, representing less than one-fourth the coverage of its parent network.

In 2000, Fox Sports West 2 was rebranded as Fox Sports Net West 2, as part of a collective brand modification of the FSN networks under the "Fox Sports Net" banner. In 2004, this was shortened to FSN West 2.

The Return of Prime Ticket

On April 3, 2006, FSN West 2 rebranded as FSN Prime Ticket (later shortened to simply Prime Ticket), beginning with the Dodgers season opener against the Atlanta Braves at Dodger Stadium. The change was primarily made as a response to perception of viewers that Fox Sports West 2 was an inferior network. The network adopted a new philosophy to concentrate more on local originally-produced content (such as the documentary series Before the Bigs and In My Own Words, and team-themed Insider shows) and less on supplemental national programming provided by Fox Sports Net. FSN West reverted to the Fox Sports West moniker in 2008.

On June 20, 2011, Commissioner of Baseball Bud Selig rejected a proposed contract extension between the Los Angeles Dodgers and Prime Ticket, citing concerns that the deal was structured in a way that most of the proceeds would end up being assigned to beleaguered Dodgers owner Frank McCourt and not the team's operations. Both Fox Sports West and the Dodgers were involved in separate lawsuits over the team's broadcast rights as well as the sale of the club. On January 10, 2012, Fox and the Dodgers reached a settlement in court, clearing the way for the sale of the team. Fox's exclusive negotiating period with the Dodgers expired on November 30, 2012 – leaving the team open to competing offers. In January 2013, Time Warner Cable signed with the Los Angeles Dodgers, establishing a new team-specific channel known as SportsNet LA.

In 2014, Prime Ticket began broadcasting Arizona Diamondbacks games via Fox Sports Arizona for viewers in the Las Vegas Valley.

The Future
On December 14, 2017, as part of a merger between both companies, The Walt Disney Company announced plans to acquire all 22 regional Fox Sports networks from 21st Century Fox, including Fox Sports West and Prime Ticket. However, on June 27, 2018, the Justice Department ordered their divestment under antitrust grounds, citing Disney's ownership of ESPN. On May 3, 2019, Sinclair Broadcast Group and Entertainment Studios (through their joint venture, Diamond Holdings) bought Fox Sports Networks from The Walt Disney Company for $10.6 billion. The deal closed on August 22, 2019.

On November 17, 2020, Sinclair announced an agreement with casino operator Bally's Corporation to serve as a new naming rights partner for the FSN channels. Sinclair announced the new Bally Sports branding for the channels on January 27, 2021. On March 31, 2021, coinciding with the 2021 Major League Baseball season, the Prime Ticket name was retired again as the channel rebranded to Bally Sports SoCal, resulting in 18 other Regional Sports Networks renamed Bally Sports in their respective regions.

On March 14, 2023, Diamond Sports filed for Chapter 11 Bankruptcy.

Programming

Overflow coverage
In the Los Angeles market, in the case of scheduling conflicts, Bally Sports SoCal will move a scheduled telecast of an Clippers or Ducks game to KCOP-TV (Channel 13), the local MyNetworkTV owned-and-operated station and former sister station to the two networks. Select Ducks games are also shown on Bally Sports West. Those KCOP Clippers and Ducks telecasts may also be streamed via the Bally Sports app for those outside of the Los Angeles DMA; Prior to the 2016-17 season, Ducks games were not streamed on the application, as Fox Sports and the National Hockey League did not come to a streaming rights agreement until the summer of 2016.

Courtside View
Bally Sports SoCal provides an alternate feed known as "Courtside View" during select Ducks and Kings home telecasts aired on Bally Sports West; the feature provides distinct camera angles and does not incorporate commentary, providing a broadcast simulating the experience of a spectator at the arena.

Notable on-air staff

Current

 John Ahlers – Anaheim Ducks play-by-play announcer
 Kent French — Ducks Live host
 Brian Hayward – Anaheim Ducks commentator and Ducks Live analyst
 Guy Hebert — Ducks Live and Angels Live analyst
 Jim Jackson –  analyst
 Don MacLean – Clippers Live analyst (former UCLA basketball commentator)
 Corey Maggette — Clippers Live analyst
 Jaime Maggio — Los Angeles Clippers sideline reporter (fil-in)
 Mike Pomeranz — Ducks Live host (rotating)
 Kristina Pink – Los Angeles Clippers sideline reporter
 Brian Sieman – Los Angeles Clippers announcer
 Jeanne Zelasko — Clippers Live host (rotating)

Former

 Chauncey Billups – Los Angeles Clippers analyst
 Michael Cage – Clippers Live analyst, former USC commentator and former analyst for Lakers Live and Bruins Live
 Eric Collins – Dodgers road announcer (games east of Arizona) and Dodgers Live anchor
 Carolyn Hughes – Dodgers Dugout (2005)
 Marques Johnson – Pac-12 basketball commentator and (2007) Trojans Live March Madness analyst
 Eric Karros – Dodgers postseason studio analyst (2003)
 Kevin Kennedy – Major League Baseball analyst
 Ralph Lawler - former Los Angeles Clippers play-by-play announcer
 Steve Lyons – Los Angeles Dodgers road commentator and Dodgers Live analyst
 Bill Macdonald – baseball, basketball, football and hockey announcer
 Adrian Garcia Marquez – Dodgers Live reporter
 Chris McGee –  Clippers Live reporter, and high school football announcer
 Marty McSorley – NHL analyst (2006)
 Rick Monday – Dodgers play-by-play announcer and Dugout analyst
 Petros Papadakis – USC football analyst and Pac-12 football commentator
 Steve Physioc – Los Angeles Angels and Pac-12 basketball announcer
 Ross Porter – Dodgers play-by-play announcer
 Lindsay Rhodes – sideline reporter, and anchor of Trojans Live and Southern California Sports Report
 Vin Scully – Los Angeles Dodgers announcer (2005–2013, retired)
 Charley Steiner – Dodgers road announcer
 Matt Stevens – UCLA football analyst
 Paul Sunderland – Pac-12, Big West and Lakers basketball announcer
 Barry Tompkins – Pac-12 football and basketball announcer
 Jim Watson – Pac-12 and LA Galaxy announcer, sideline reporter, and anchor of "Dodgers Live" and "Dodgers Dugout"
 Paul Westphal – NBA analyst, USC basketball commentator
 Van Earl Wright – anchor of Southern California Sports Report, Dodgers Dugout (2004) and Kings "Break the Ice" (2004)

Out of Market Carriage

San Diego County

Bally Sports West maintains widespread cable carriage in San Diego County. However, the two major providers in the area, Time Warner Cable and Cox Communications, have refused to carry Prime Ticket since its launch in 1997; both cable providers claim that the network has asked for carriage fees they deemed to be too expensive for carriage on their expanded basic tiers. However, Prime Ticket was carried on some former systems that Time Warner Cable acquired in 2006 from Adelphia Communications. Adelphia had added the channel to their lineup in 2001.

On March 17, 2012, as part of a contract signed with FSN to acquire the local cable rights to the San Diego Padres, Fox Sports Networks created a separate regional network for the San Diego market, Fox Sports San Diego. Despite that channel's launch, Bally Sports West remains available on cable providers in the San Diego area; however, Bally Sports San Diego carries some programming (including most live sporting events) from Bally Sports SoCal, which essentially makes striking any carriage agreement for that channel unnecessary.

Las Vegas Valley

Bally Sports West and Bally Sports SoCal maintain widespread cable carriage in the Las Vegas Valley.
On May 23, 2017, it was announced that AT&T SportsNet had acquired the RSN rights to the Vegas Golden Knights to televise broadcast games in Southern Nevada on AT&T SportsNet Rocky Mountain which started in the 2017–2018 NHL Season.

Because the Vegas Golden Knights hold territorial rights for all of Southern Nevada, Anaheim Ducks and Los Angeles Kings games are blacked out in the Las Vegas Valley on Bally Sports West and Bally Sports SoCal regardless of the cable or satellite provider, requiring a subscription to the NHL Center Ice out-of-market sports package to view those telecasts. All other sports programming, with the exception of Ducks and Kings hockey games carried on Bally Sports West and Bally Sports SoCal, is available in Southern Nevada.

Ending of Dodgers
In 2013, after the Dodgers ended with Fox, The Dodgers would leave Prime Ticket and start their own network with Time Warner Cable, SportsNet LA.

References

External links
 

Bally Sports
Fox Sports Networks
Television stations in Los Angeles
Television channels and stations established in 1997
Companies that filed for Chapter 11 bankruptcy in 2023
West Coast Conference
1997 establishments in California